Franz Weber (born 3 July 1888, date of death unknown) was an Austrian football player. He was born in Vienna. He played for the club Vienna, and also for the Austria national football team. He competed at the 1912 Summer Olympics in Stockholm.

References

External links

1888 births
Year of death unknown
Footballers from Vienna
Austrian footballers
Austria international footballers
Footballers at the 1912 Summer Olympics
Olympic footballers of Austria
Association football defenders
First Vienna FC players